The Merseybeats are an English beat band that emerged from the Liverpool Merseybeat scene in the early 1960s, performing at the Cavern Club along with the Beatles, Gerry and the Pacemakers, and other similar artists.

The current line-up is: Tony Crane MBE (founding member) lead vocals and lead guitar and his son Adrian Crane on keyboards and lead guitar.

History

The Merseybeats
Originally called the Mavericks, the band was formed by Tony Crane and Billy Kinsley in late 1960. They became the Pacifics in September 1961. They were renamed the Mersey Beats in February 1962 by Bob Wooler, MC at the Cavern Club. In April 1962, they became the Merseybeats. By now Crane and Kinsley had joined up with guitarist Aaron Williams and drummer John Banks.

They signed a recording contract with Fontana Records and had their first hit single in 1963 with "It's Love That Really Counts", followed in 1964 by their million-selling record "I Think of You", which gained them their first gold disc. They suffered a setback in February 1964 when Kinsley left to form his own band, the Kinsleys. He was temporarily replaced by Bob Garner (later of the Creation) and permanently by Johnny Gustafson, formerly of The Big Three.

With Gustafson they had two more major hits, "Don't Turn Around" and "Wishin' and Hopin' ". Other successful recordings included "Last Night", "Don't Let it Happen to Us", "I Love You, Yes I Do", "I Stand Accused", "Mr. Moonlight", "Really Mystified" and "The Fortune Teller". Kinsley returned to the group in late 1964.

The Merseybeats appeared regularly at Liverpool's Cavern Club, and they claim to have appeared there with the Beatles on more occasions than any other band from that era. They were also successful abroad, touring in Germany and the US in 1964, and having their own Merseybeats Show on Italian television.

The Merseys
After their initial success had waned, the band folded and in 1966 Crane and Kinsley formed a vocal duo called the Merseys. They had a major hit with their first single, a cover of the McCoys' "Sorrow", which reached Number 4 in the UK Singles Chart.  The introduction on the record featured a bowed bass played by Jack Bruce. A line from this song, "with your long blonde hair and eyes of blue," is included in the Beatles' "It's All Too Much", released in 1969 as part of the Yellow Submarine soundtrack album. David Bowie recorded a single version in 1973 which reached #3 in the UK Singles Chart. The duo split in 1968, with Crane and Kinsley both going on to front a number of other bands.

Tony Crane and The Merseybeats
During the 1970s Crane continued to tour and perform live as Tony Crane and the Merseybeats, with various line-ups.

Liverpool Express
See Liverpool Express

The Merseybeats re-formed
The Merseybeats' founding member and drummer John Banks died on 20 April 1988, at the age of 44.

However, Kinsley and Crane re-formed the Merseybeats in 1993, and after celebrating 45 years in the music industry in 2006, they continued to tour and perform on the 'sixties circuit', and at venues in the UK, and across Europe.

Members
Current

Tony Crane – lead guitars, lead vocals (1961–present)
Adrian Crane - keyboards, lead guitar (2000-present)

Former
Billy Kinsley – rhythm guitars (previously bass), lead vocals (1961–1964, 1964–1974, 1993–2020)
David Elias – rhythm guitar, backing vocals (1961–1962)
Frank Sloane – drums (1961–1962)
Aaron Williams – rhythm guitars, backing vocals (1962–1966)
John Banks – drums (1962–1966)
Bob Garner – bass guitar, lead vocals (1964)
Johnny Gustafson – bass, lead vocals (1964)
Ken Mundye – drums (1965–1966, 1969–1974; a member of "The Fruit Eating Bears" during the time of "The Merseys")
Allan Cosgrove – drums (1974–2000)
Bob Packham – bass, backing vocals (1974–2021)
Colin Drummond – keyboards, violin (1986–1993)
Dave Goldberg – keyboards (1993–2000, 2009–2011)
Lou Rosenthal – drums (2000–2021)
Chris Finley – keyboards (2011)
Toni Baker – keyboards (2011)
Alan Lovell – rhythm guitars, lead vocals (2011)
Rocking Johnny John Houghton – Lead guitars, backing vocals (1979-1981)

The Fruit Eating Bears (Merseys' backing band; 1966–1969)

Joey Molland – guitars
Chris Finley – keyboards
George Cassidy – bass
Kenny Goodlass – drums
Ken Mundye – drums

Discography

Albums
 1963: Oriole compilation – This Is Merseybeat Volume One (one track – "Our Day Will Come")
 1964: Fontana – The Merseybeats – UK #12:
Milkman
Hello Young Lovers	
He Will Break Your Heart	
Funny Face	
Really Mystified	
The Girl That I Marry	
Fools Like Me	
My Heart and I	
Bring It on Home to Me	
Lavender Blue	
Jumping Jonah	
Don't Turn Around
 1966: Wing – The Merseybeats (reissue of the Fontana LP)
 1977: Look – The Merseybeats Greatest Hits
 1978: Crane Productions – Tony Crane Sings Elvis Presley
 1982: Edsel – The Merseybeats Beats & Ballads

EPs
 1963: Fontana – I Think of You:
I Think Of You
Mister Moonlight
It's Love That Really Counts
The Fortune Teller
 1964: Fontana – The Merseybeats on Stage:
Long Tall Sally
I'm Gonna Sit Right Down And Cry
Shame
You Can't Judge A Book By Its Cover
 1964: Fontana – Wishin' and Hopin:
Wishin' and Hopin'
Hello, Young Lovers
Milkman
Jumping Jonah

Singles
 1963: Fontana – "It's Love That Really Counts" / "The Fortune Teller" – UK #24
 1963: Fontana – "I Think of You" / "Mr. Moonlight" – UK #5
 1964: Fontana – "Don't Turn Around" / "Really Mystified" – UK #13
 1964: Fontana – "Wishin' and Hopin' " / "Milkman" – UK #13
 1964: Fontana – "Last Night" / "See Me Back" – UK #40
 1965: Fontana – "Don't Let it Happen to Us" / "It Would Take a Long Long Time"
 1965: Fontana – "I Love You, Yes I Do" / "Good Good Lovin'" – UK #22
 1965: Fontana – "I Stand Accused" / "All My Life" – UK #38

CDs
 1990: Fontana – The Merseybeats
 1992: Trace – The Merseybeats
 1993: Amadeus – I'll Get You
 1993: Amadeus – I'll Get You (Extended)
 1996: Javelin – The Merseybeats
 1997: Karussell – The Very Best of the Merseybeats
 1999: Crane – The Merseybeats Greatest Hits
 2002: Bear Family Records – I Think of You – The Complete Recordings
 2003: Crane – The Merseybeats Greatest Hits
 2003: Merseybeat – Anniversary Tour 2003
 12-track compilation with The Swinging Blue Jeans and The Fourmost; The Merseybeats' four tracks – "Sorrow" / "This Time" / "Don't Ask Me to Be Friends" / "Poor Boy from Liverpool"
 2003: This Time – "This Time" / "Don't Ask Me to Be Friends" / "Poor Boy from Liverpool"                  
 2021: Cherry Red Records - The Merseybeats/The Merseys - I Stand Accused - The Complete Sixties Recordings

Cassettes
 1977: Crane Productions – The Merseybeats Greatest Hits

Videos
 1999: The Merseybeats in Concert
 1999: Tony Crane Sings Elvis Presley

The Merseys discography
 1966: Fontana – "Sorrow" / "Some Other Day" – UK #4
 1966: Fontana – "So Sad About Us" / "Love Will Continue"
 1966: Fontana – "Rhythm of Love" / "Is It Love"
 1966: Fontana – Rhythm of Love (EP)
 1967: Fontana – "The Cat" / "Change of Heart"
 1967: Fontana – "Penny in My Pocket" / "I Hope You're Happy"
 1968: Fontana – "Lovely Loretta" / "Dreaming"
 1968: Fontana – "Honey Do" / "It Happens All the Time" (as Crackers)
 1973: Philips – "Sorrow" / "I Think of You"

Notes

References

Further reading
 Call Up the Groups, Alan Clayson, 1985, Blandford Press –

External links
 
 
 
 [ The Merseybeats biography at Allmusic]
 Liverpool Express website
 Lou Rosenthal Interview NAMM Oral History Library (2019)

English rock music groups
Musical groups established in 1961
Musical groups from Liverpool
English pop music groups
Beat groups
Fontana Records artists
1961 establishments in England